Cavitt Creek Bridge is a covered bridge in Douglas County in the U.S. state of Oregon. Cavitt Creek and the road and bridge were named for Robert L. Cavitt, who settled along the creek in the mid-19th century.

Cavitt Creek, a tributary of the Little River, enters the river upstream of the bridge. Cavitt Creek Road, after crossing Jim Creek, another Little River tributary, intersects Little River Road at the north end of the bridge.

Notable Features 

 Tudor portal arches allow room for log trucks, unhewn timbers for truss chords, three windows on each side, a metal roof, and long narrow slits above each truss for better lighting and ventilation. 
 The bridge was part of a thematic nomination of Oregon's covered bridges in 1979, but Douglas County blocked the listing.

See also
 List of Oregon covered bridges

References

Bridges completed in 1943
Bridges in Douglas County, Oregon
Covered bridges in Oregon
Road bridges in Oregon
Wooden bridges in Oregon
Tourist attractions in Douglas County, Oregon
Howe truss bridges in the United States
1943 establishments in Oregon